Lucien Giles Castaing-Taylor (born 10 January 1966, Liverpool, United Kingdom) is a British anthropologist and artist who works in film, video, and photography.

Biography
Castaing-Taylor received his B.A. at Cambridge University and his PhD at the University of California, Berkeley under Paul Rabinow. Since 2002 Castaing-Taylor has taught at Harvard University, where he is Director of the Sensory Ethnography Lab.  His works include In and Out of Africa, which he made with Ilisa Barbash in 1992.  It is an ethnographic video about issues of authenticity, taste, and racial politics in the African art market that won eight international awards.  He also recorded the film Sweetgrass (2009), which is described as "an unsentimental elegy at once to the American West and to the 10,000 years of uneasy accommodation between post-Paleolithic humans and animals."  He is the founding editor of the American Anthropological Association’s journal Visual Anthropology Review (1991–94).

Filmography 
 In and Out of Africa (1992, with Ilisa Barbash)
 Made in USA (1997, with Ilisa Barbash)
 Sweetgrass (2009, with Ilisa Barbash)
 The High Trail (2010)
 Leviathan (2012, with Véréna Paravel)
 Caniba (2017, with Véréna Paravel)
 De Humani Corporis Fabrica (2022, with Véréna Paravel)

Bibliography 
 Visualizing Theory (1994)
 Cross-Cultural Filmmaking (1997, with Ilisa Barbash)
 Transcultural Cinema, essays by David MacDougall (1998)
 The Cinema of Robert Gardner (2008, with Ilisa Barbash)

References

External links 
 Sweetgrass Official Website

Living people
British anthropologists
British film directors
University of California, Berkeley alumni
Harvard University faculty
1966 births
Academics from Liverpool